The 2019–20 Ole Miss Rebels women's basketball team represented the University of Mississippi during the 2019–20 NCAA Division I women's basketball season. The Rebels, led by second-year head coach Yolett McPhee-McCuin, played their home games at The Pavilion at Ole Miss and competed as members of the Southeastern Conference (SEC).

They finished the season with a record of 7–23, 0–16 in the SEC, and were eliminated in the first round of the SEC women's tournament by Missouri.

Previous season
The Rebels finished the season with a 9–22 overall record and a 3–13 record in conference play. The Rebels lost to Florida in the First Round of the SEC tournament. The Rebels were not invited to the postseason.

Offseason

Departures

2019 recruiting class

Incoming transfers

Preseason

SEC media poll
The SEC media poll was released on October 15, 2019.

Roster

Schedule

|-
!colspan=9 style=| Exhibition

|-
!colspan=9 style=| Non-conference regular season

|-
!colspan=9 style=| SEC regular season

|-
!colspan=9 style=| SEC Tournament

References

Ole Miss Rebels women's basketball seasons
Ole Miss
Ole Miss Rebels
Ole Miss Rebels